Kyrgyz-Kyshtak is a village in Batken Region of Kyrgyzstan. It is part of the Kadamjay District. Its population was 1,299 in 2021. Nearby towns and villages include Kara-Jygach and Pum.

References

External links 
 Satellite map at Maplandia.com

Populated places in Batken Region